"L-O-N-E-L-Y" is a song written and sung by Bobby Vinton, which he released in 1965. The song spent 8 weeks on the Billboard Hot 100 chart, peaking at No. 22, while reaching No. 7 on Billboards Pop-Standards Singles chart, and No. 1 on Canada's "RPM Play Sheet".

Cash Box described it as "a lyrical, slow-moving heartfelt tearjerker on which the chanter plaintively offers six reasons for his unhappiness."

Chart performance

References

1965 songs
1965 singles
Bobby Vinton songs
Epic Records singles
RPM Top Singles number-one singles
Songs written by Bobby Vinton